Tariq Kinte Kirksay (born September 7, 1979) is a French American professional basketball player for Fos Provence Basket of the French LNB Pro A. He was born in the Bronx, New York, where he grew up.

High school
Kirksay played basketball at Rice High School, in New York City, New York.

College
Kirksay played college basketball at Iona College, with the Iona Gaels, from 1996 to 2000. He was a two-time All-Metro Atlantic Athletic Conference (MAAC) First Team selection, in the years 1999 and 2000.

Professional career

Kirksay won the Russian Cup with UNICS Kazan in 2009. He was named to the European-wide 2nd-tier level EuroCup's All-EuroCup First Team of the 2010–11 season.
In 2017 he signs for the Spanish team Iberostar Tenerife, winning the Basketball Champions League Final Four.

French national team
Kirksay was a member of the senior men's French national basketball team. With France's senior team, he played at the EuroBasket 2007.

External links 

Profile at eurocupbasketball.com
Profile at fiba.com (archive)
Profile at Eurobasket.com
Profile at ACB.com 
Profile at Legabasket.it 

1979 births
Living people
American expatriate basketball people in France
American expatriate basketball people in Italy
American expatriate basketball people in Portugal
American expatriate basketball people in Russia
American expatriate basketball people in Spain
American expatriate basketball people in Venezuela
American men's basketball players
Basketball players from New York City
BC UNICS players
Besançon BCD players
Bucaneros de La Guaira players
C.D. Primeiro de Agosto men's basketball players
CB Canarias players
CB Estudiantes players
Fos Provence Basket players
French men's basketball players
French people of American descent
Iona Gaels men's basketball players
JL Bourg-en-Bresse players
Joventut Badalona players
Liga ACB players
Real Betis Baloncesto players
Shooting guards
SLUC Nancy Basket players
Small forwards
Sportspeople from the Bronx
Sutor Basket Montegranaro players